Syritta bulbus is a species of syrphid fly in the family Syrphidae.

Distribution
Cameroun, Congo, Ghana, Malawi, Zimbabwe.

References

Eristalinae
Diptera of Africa
Insects described in 1849
Taxa named by Francis Walker (entomologist)